Pattannur  is a village in Kannur district in the Indian state of Kerala. It is 4 km away from Irikkur and 7 km away from Mattanur.

Demographics
As of 2011 Census, Pattannur had a population of 15,003 with 7,177 males and 7,826 females. The average male female sex ratio was 1090 higher than the state average of 1084. In Pattannur, 12.6% of the population was under 6 years of age. Pattannur had an average literacy of 94.26% higher than the state average of 94.00%: male literacy was 97.26% and female literacy was 91.55%.

Transportation
The national highway passes through Taliparamba town. Mangalore and Mumbai can be accessed on the northern side and Cochin and Thiruvananthapuram can be accessed on the southern side. The road to the east connects to Mysore and Bangalore. The nearest railway station is Kannur on Mangalore-Palakkad line.

References

Villages near Irikkur